Selby coalfield (also known as the Selby complex, or Selby 'superpit') was a large-scale deep underground mine complex based around Selby, North Yorkshire, England, with pitheads at Wistow Mine, Stillingfleet Mine, Riccall Mine, North Selby Mine, Whitemoor Mine and at Gascoigne Wood Mine; all coal was brought to the surface and treated at Gascoigne Wood, being distributed onwards by rail. The primary purpose of the pit was to supply coal for electrical power generation; much of it was used in the nearby Aire valley power stations.

Mining peaked in 1993–4 at 12 million tonnes a year. The mines were acquired by RJB Mining in 1997 after the privatisation of the coal industry; loss of financial subsidy, geological problems, and low UK coal prices made the pits unprofitable by the 21st century. Closure was announced in 2002, and mining completely ceased by 2004.

History

In 1974, the Labour Government and National Coal Board (NCB), backed by the National Union of Mineworkers (NUM) initiated a decade-long, ambitious expansion of coal production, named the Plan for Coal; the plan was based on maximising income from indigenous coal reserves, at a time when oil prices had risen (1973 oil crisis) to above that of coal. The plan included continued closure of older pits, and investment in new capacity; Selby Coalfield was a major element of the plan.

Exploratory drilling in the Selby area had taken place in the 1960s, and detailed exploration was carried out in the early 1970s, showing that a northern extension of the 'Barnsley Seam' was present and between 1.9 and 3.25 m thick, resulting in an estimate of 600 million tonnes of coal in the seam, with total estimated coal reserves of 2,000 million tonnes. Open extraction would have required a stripping ratio of around 500:1, so the coal was extracted by underground mining. A geological report "Coal reserves in the Selby Area" was published 1972, and planning permission sought for a mine in 1974, which was given in 1976 after opposition, including concerns about flooding of low-lying land due to subsidence; extraction was limited to the Barnsley seam, though other seams existed.

The project was formally inaugurated by the Duchess of Kent in 1976. Initial estimates were for a construction cost of £400 million, with 4,000 people employed, with extraction beginning in the early 1980s and lasting for 40 years, producing 10 million tons per year. The scheme used an unusual arrangement of pits in the coal field – all coal was brought to the surface at the drift mine of Gascoigne Wood, whilst five pits were created to the east (Wistow, North Selby, Riccall, Stillingfleet, and Whitemoor) which transferred their coal via tunnels to Gascoigne Wood. As part of the construction processes, the NCB paid for diversion of the East Coast Main Line from Selby (see Selby Diversion) to avoid areas that could be subject to mining subsidence. Above ground equipment such as the winding gear was constructed enclosed by cladding and with limited height, to limit the visual impact on the environment, which was a predominately rural landscape. Shafts for the pits were first sunk in the late 1970s, and in 1983 the Wistow Mine began production.

The workforce was planned from the outset to be transferred from 11 collieries that were nearing exhaustion in the area around Wakefield and Rothwell, starting in 1978-9 with the transfer of miners from Walton Colliery, near Wakefield.  The collation of the workforce was due to be completed by 1986, but the Nostell miners did not transfer until 1987 and the process was not finished until the transfer of the Sharlston miners in 1993.  Large car parks were built to facilitate commuting.

The new mine produced no coal in 1984/5 due to the UK miners' strike (1984–1985). Gascoigne Wood was the scene of clashes between pickets and police.

Output steadily rose from 1984 to 1994, reaching 10 million tonnes a year in 1992–93.

In 1993/4, the complex had peak output of 12 million tonnes p.a. In 1994, the Coal Industry Act created the legal framework for the breakup of British Coal; in 1995, the coalfield was acquired by RJB Mining. Geological problems caused some coal seams to be ignored, and Whitemoor Mine was merged with Riccall Mine in 1996, and North Selby Mine with Stillingfleet Mine in 1997. By 2000, production was 4.4 million tonnes p.a.

Between 1995 and 1999, the operation turned from being successfully profitable to loss-making, with the first loss recorded in 1999; relatively fixed costs associated with the single exit-point at Gascoigne Wood meant that the mine became less profitable as production was reduced at the five pits. By 2000, the loss was £30 million p.a. and it received no subsidy; in 2002, it was announced by UK Coal that the Selby coalfield would close in 2003/4. Mining ended in 2004 at Wistow (May), Stillingfleet (July), and Riccall (October). The total amount of coal mined was 121 million tonnes.

Post closure

The Gascoigne Wood Mine site is the largest, with  developable land, and best connected of the former mine sites, with rail connection onto the former Leeds and Selby Railway (Leeds-Hull Line) including sidings for trains of up to 775 m. On site facilities include a 58 MW electrical grid connection, and the site is close to the large Sherburn-in-Elmet Industrial Estate, and directly south of Sherburn-in-Elmet Airfield. Planning permission for re-use of buildings and infrastructure was granted in 2007. Beginning 2008 part of the site has been used on short term lease to British Gypsum for storage of Gypsum produced at Drax Power Station as a byproduct of flue gas desulphurisation. The site has also been proposed for use as a manufacturing site for rail vehicles (Hitachi, rejected 2010), and an Eco-town development (rejected by Selby District Council 2008).

The Whitemoor Mine and North Selby mine sites were converted to mixed commercial use as business parks by December 2005.

Riccall Mine has been converted to an industrial and office development, having received planning permission for the development in 2007.

In 2009 the North Selby Mine was proposed as a renewable energy site, using waste as a feedstock for electricity generation. The initially proposed energy generation methods of incineration and gasification were dropped in 2011 with the plan had been modified to include a larger facility for anaerobic digestion, as well as using in vessel composting of organic waste. The plan was dropped and a new application was put forward to redevelop the land as leisure accommodation.

As of early 2012 Stillingfleet Mine has been partially redeveloped, being used for extraction and generation from coal mine gas, further redevelopment as a waste sorting centre is being sought.

As of early 2012 Wistow Mine has not been redeveloped, land manager Haworth Estates, is seeking redevelopment of the site which utilises the legacy on site facilities, which includes a 12 MW electrical grid connection and the regeneration of the site into an industrial park. As of 2022 the site has not been redeveloped and is used as a storage facility for redundant HGV trailers.

References

Sources

Literature

Locations

External links

, BBC Radio 4 documentary (.ram RealAudio streaming file)

Selby
Selby